Karen Hao is an American journalist and data scientist. Currently a journalist based in Hong Kong for The Wall Street Journal and previously senior artificial intelligence editor at the MIT Technology Review, she is best known for her coverage on AI research, technology ethics and the social impact of AI. Hao also co-produces the podcast In Machines We Trust and writes the newsletter The Algorithm.

Previously, she worked at Quartz as a tech reporter and data scientist and was an application engineer at the first startup to spin out of Google X. Hao's writing has also appeared in Mother Jones, Sierra Magazine, The New Republic, and other publications.

Early life and education 
Hao graduated from The Lawrenceville School in 2011. She studied at the Massachusetts Institute of Technology, graduating with a B.S. in mechanical engineering and a minor in energy studies in 2015. She is a native speaker in both English and Mandarin Chinese.

Career 
Hao is known in the technology world for her coverage of new AI research findings and their societal and ethical impacts. Her writing has spanned research and issues regarding big tech data privacy, misinformation, deepfakes, facial recognition, and AI healthcare tools.

In March 2021, Hao published a piece that uncovered previously unknown information about how attempts to combat misinformation by different teams at Facebook's using machine learning were impeded and constantly at odds by Facebook's drive to grow user engagement. Upon its release, leaders at Facebook including Mike Schroepfer and Yann LeCun immediately criticized the piece through Twitter responses. AI researchers and AI ethics experts Timnit Gebru and Margaret Mitchell responded in support of Hao's writing and advocated for more change and improvement for all.

Hao also co-produces the podcast In Machines We Trust, which discusses the rise of AI with people developing, researching, and using AI technologies. The podcast won the 2020 Front Page Award in investigative reporting.

As a data scientist, Hao occasionally creates data visualizations that have been featured in her work at the MIT Technology Review and elsewhere. In 2018, her "What is AI?" flowchart visualization was exhibited as an installation at the Museum of Applied Arts in Vienna.

She has been an invited speaker at TEDxGateway, the United Nations Foundation, EmTech, WNPR, and many other conferences and podcasts. Her TEDx talk discussed the importance of democratizing how AI is built.

In March 2022, she was hired by The Wall Street Journal to cover China technology and society, while being based in Hong Kong.

Selected awards and honors 

 2019 Webby Award nominee for best newsletter, as a writer of The Algorithm 
 2021 Front Page Award in investigative reporting, as a co-producer for In Machines We Trust
2021 Ambies Award nominee for best knowledge and science podcast, as a co-producer for In Machines We Trust
2021 Webby Award nominee for best technology podcast, as a co-producer for In Machines We Trust

References 

Living people
Massachusetts Institute of Technology alumni
21st-century American newspaper editors
21st-century American women writers
American newspaper reporters and correspondents
American women journalists
American women journalists of Asian descent
American women non-fiction writers
American journalists of Asian descent
Artificial intelligence
Ethics of science and technology
Year of birth missing (living people)
Lawrenceville School alumni
The Wall Street Journal people